Bezunesh Bekele Sertsu (born 29 January 1983) is an Ethiopian long-distance runner who specializes in cross-country running and marathons.

Biography
She was born in the Ethiopian capital of Addis Ababa. She took a number of circuit wins on the road in her first few years of competition, having back-to-back wins at the Montferland Run in 2004 and 2005, as well as a win at the Rotterdam Half Marathon. She won the Cross Internacional de Itálica in 2006 and finished in sixth place in the short race at the 2006 IAAF World Cross Country Championships later that season. The following year she took prominent circuit victories at the Zevenheuvelenloop and the Portugal Half Marathon.

At the 2007 IAAF World Road Running Championships she finished fourth and set a new national half marathon record of 1:08:07. The record was beaten by Dire Tune, who won the 2009 Ras Al Khaimah Half Marathon setting the Ethiopian half marathon record of 1:07:18. Bizunesh narrowly missed being selected for the 2008 Ethiopian Olympic team. Although Bizunesh had faster times, Dire Tune was chosen for the team instead, leading to a strained relationship between the two runners. Bezunesh was third at the Great Manchester Run in 2008, finishing behind Jo Pavey and Rose Cheruiyot.

She made her marathon debut with a run of 2:23:09 in the 2008 Dubai Marathon, taking second place behind Birhane Adere and running one of fastest ever times for a débutante. She returned to the race the following year and won, beating Atsede Habtamu to the finish by over a minute. At the 2009 World Championships in Athletics she was selected to compete in the marathon for Ethiopia and she finished in 16th place. She ran at the London Marathon in April 2010 and was fourth in a time of 2:23:17. At a rainy Berlin Marathon in September that year she finished the race in 2:24:58, which was enough to take second place behind Aberu Kebede.

A return to London in 2011 saw her make the best finish by an Ethiopian, coming fourth in 2:23:42 hours. At the 2011 World Championships in Athletics she finished fourth again, narrowly missing out on the podium. Bezunesh improved her four-year-old personal best time with a run at the 2012 Dubai Marathon. Her time of 2:20:30 hours for fourth place moved her into the top twenty fastest woman for the event and made her the third fastest Ethiopian woman.

She placed fourth at the Yangzhou Half Marathon in April, but had better performances in the second half of the year: she won the Great Scottish Run, set a 10-mile personal best of 51:45 minutes as the runner-up at the Dam tot Damloop, and came fourth at the Frankfurt Marathon.

Bezunesh's husband, Tessema Abshiro, is also a marathon runner with the Ethiopian national team.

Achievements

Personal bests

References

1983 births
Living people
Ethiopian female marathon runners
Ethiopian female long-distance runners
Athletes from Addis Ababa